was a Japanese film director and screenwriter. He was best known for making yakuza films at the Toei Company in 1960s.

Biography 
Born in Hyōgo Prefecture, Kato was the nephew of the film director Sadao Yamanaka. He entered the Toho studio in 1937 and first began by working on documentaries. He worked as an assistant director to Akira Kurosawa in Rashomon. After World War II he switched to making jidaigeki.

Style and influences 
Kevin Thomas of Los Angeles Times noted that Kato has been compared with Budd Boetticher and Samuel Fuller.

Selected filmography 
 Brave Records of the Sanada Clan (1963)
 Kaze no Bushi (1964)
 Bakumatsu zankoku monogatari (AKA Cruel Story of the Shogunate's Downfall) (1964)
 Meiji Kyokyakuden: Sandaime Shumei (1965)
 Kutsukake Tokijiro: Yukyo Ippiki (1966)
 By a Man's Face Shall You Know Him (1966)
 I, the Executioner (1968)
 Red Peony Gambler: Hanafuda Shobu (1969)
 Red Peony Gambler: Oryu Sanjo (1970)
 Miyamoto Musashi (1973)
 Ondekoza (1981)

References

External links 
 
 

1916 births
1985 deaths
Japanese film directors
Samurai film directors